Ain't Ever Satisfied: The Steve Earle Collection is a compilation album by Steve Earle, drawn from his years with the MCA label. The album was released on July, 1996.

Track listing
All songs written by Steve Earle unless otherwise noted.
"Guitar Town"
"Good Ol' Boy (Gettin' Tough)" (Richard Bennett, Steve Earle)	
"Hillbilly Highway" (Steve Earle, Jimbeau Hinson)
"My Old Friend the Blues"	
"Fearless Heart"	
"Think It Over" (Richard Bennett, Steve Earle)	
"Someday"	
"Goodbye's All We've Got Left"
"State Trooper" (live)	(Bruce Springsteen)
"I Ain't Ever Satisfied" 	
"Nowhere Road"	(Steve Earle, Reno Kling)
"The Rain Came Down" (Steve Earle, Michael Woody)	
"I Love You Too Much"	
"The Week of Living Dangerously"	
"Continental Trailways Blues"
Featured in the 1987 film, Planes, Trains & Automobiles, but not included on the soundtrack album.
"Six Days on the Road"	(Earl Green, Carl Montgomery)
Originally featured on the soundtrack album for Planes, Trains & Automobiles.
"Copperhead Road" – 4:32
"Snake Oil" – 3:30
"Even When I'm Blue" – 4:14
"Devil's Right Hand" – 3:04
"Nothing But a Child" – 4:25
"Johnny Come Lately" – 4:08
"Dead Flowers" (live) – 5:38 (Mick Jagger, Keith Richards)
"The Other Kind" – 5:11
"When the People Find Out" – 4:13
"Billy Austin" – 6:17
"She's About a Mover" (live) – 4:10 (Doug Sahm)
"West Nashville Boogie" (live) – 7:41

References

Steve Earle compilation albums
1996 compilation albums